İrem Yaman (born August 4, 1995) is a twice world champion Turkish taekwondo athlete competed in the lightweight division, and an amateur kickboxer. In 2021, she retired from the taekwondo.

Private life
İrem Yaman was born on August 4, 1995. She began practising taekwondo at the age of eight.

She studied Physical Education and Sports at Hacettepe University in Ankara, and was a member of the university's taekwondo team. After earning her bachelor's degree, she went on to conduct study for a master's degree at Selçuk University's Sports Department in Konya.

Sports career
Kickboxing
İrem Yaman won the bronze medal in the +70 kg semi-contact category at the 2012 WAKO World Kickboxing Championships for Cadets and Juniors held in Bratislava, Slovakia. The next year, she fought a silver medal at the W.A.K.O. European Kickboxing Championships 2013 for Juniors held in Krynica-Zdrój, Poland.

Taekwondo
Yaman debuted internationally in taekwondo in 2014, and became gold medalist at the European Under 21 Championship in Innsbruck, Austria in 2014, and continued her success by winning another gold medals at tournaments in 2015 including Turkish Open in Antalya, Luxor Open in Luxor, Egypt, Ukraine Open in Kharkov and Moldova Open in Chisinau. At age 18, she became world champion at the 2015 World Taekwondo Championships held in Chelyabinsk, Russia.

As of 2018, she ranks first in the World Taekwondo's 62 kg list with 253.81 points.

Turkish world champion Irem Yaman won the gold medal in women's 62 kg category in 2019 World Taekwondo Championships in Manchester, UK on Sunday. Beating her Brazilian opponent Caroline Santos 21–7 in the final match, Yaman protected her title as the world champion she won in 2015 and became the first Turkish female athlete to win the gold medal twice in taekwondo. 23-year old Irem Yaman becomes first female Turkish athlete to win gold twice in taekwondo.

References

External links
 

Living people
1995 births
Place of birth missing (living people)
Hacettepe University alumni
Selçuk University alumni
Turkish female taekwondo practitioners
Turkish female kickboxers
European champions for Turkey
Universiade medalists in taekwondo
Competitors at the 2018 Mediterranean Games
Mediterranean Games gold medalists for Turkey
Mediterranean Games medalists in taekwondo
Universiade gold medalists for Turkey
Universiade silver medalists for Turkey
World Taekwondo Championships medalists
Medalists at the 2015 Summer Universiade
Medalists at the 2017 Summer Universiade
Medalists at the 2019 Summer Universiade
European Taekwondo Championships medalists
21st-century Turkish women